WBM is an acronym that may refer to:

 Vo language (ISO code wbm)
 Wapenamanda Airport (IATA code WBM)
 West Bend–Mallard Community School District, Iowa, United States
 World Basketball Manager, a series of video games
 World Brand Management, a former name of the brand Björn Borg

See also 
 WBMS (disambiguation)